This list of prime ministers of Italy lists each prime minister in order of term length. This is based on the difference between dates; if counted by number of calendar days all the figures would be one greater.

Alcide De Gasperi is the only prime minister who has held this position both in the Kingdom of Italy and in the Republic of Italy.

Of the 60 prime ministers, 2 have served for more than 10 years (Benito Mussolini and Giovanni Giolitti), 6 have served between 5 and 10 years, 34 have served between 1 and 5 years while 18 have served less than a year in office. 

Benito Mussolini is the longest-serving prime minister, serving for over 20 years. The longest-serving Prime Minister of a democratic Italy is Giovanni Giolitti who served over 10 years in office, while the longest-serving Prime Minister of Post-War Italy is Silvio Berlusconi who served over 9 years. 

On the other hand, the shortest-serving Prime Minister of Italy is Tommaso Tittoni who served 16 days as an interim leader, while Fernando Tambroni served around four months is the shortest-serving Prime Minister of post-war Italy.

Complete list (1861–present)

Kingdom of Italy (1861–1946)

Italian Republic (1946–present)

References 
List of prime ministers of Italy
List of presidents of Italy by time in office
List of international trips made by prime ministers of Italy

Prime Ministers of Italy
Italy, Prime Ministers
Italy, time in office
Prime ministers, time in office